WCLU is a radio station broadcasting an Oldies format at a frequency of 1490 kHz. It is licensed to Glasgow, Kentucky, United States, and serving Glasgow, Bowling Green, and the Caveland area of south-central Kentucky, the station is owned by Royse Radio, Incorporated.

History
The station has an estimated sign on date of September 23, 1946 as WKAY, the first of two radio stations originally owned by Glasgow Broadcasting, Inc., along with WGGC-FM when it signed on in 1961. As one of the first new radio stations to sign on after the second world war, WCLU's original studios were located at 510 Happy Valley Road in Glasgow, which was demolished in November 2014 to make room for a new drug store. The station's original transmitting tower was made entirely of  worth of cast iron oil well casing, due to the unavailability of structural steel during World War II and its immediate aftermath; a real tower wasn't erected until 1963. After completing that tower in 1963, the station increased their broadcast power to 1,000 watts by day, and 250 watts by night. 

In 1971, both WKAY and WGGC went under ownership of the Sadler family, which were involved in operating the station since 1948. Shortly before this happened, WKAY switched to a middle-of-the-road format. In 1988, the AM station was purchased by its current owner, Royse Radio, presided by former WCDS employee Henry Royse, who changed the station's call letters to the current WCLU afterwards. In 1991, WCLU moved into a new facility on West Main Street in downtown Glasgow, with the AM station's transmission tower and WGGC studios remaining at the old studios; WGGC would relocate its studios and broadcasting license to Bowling Green in 2002. 

Sometime in the mid 2010s, the station launched a low-powered FM translator, W276DO, to make the station's programming available to FM listeners.

Programming format 
The station's current oldies format is also accompanied with local talk radio programming, including local newscasts, and local sports coverage. Top-of-hour national newscasts alternate between affiliations with CBS Radio News and ABC News Radio. News updates from the Kentucky News Network are also provided by the station.

Sports programming
WCLU is also home to sports games of the Glasgow High School football and basketball teams. In the 1960s and parts of the 1970s, the station also aired radio coverage of football and basketball games of the Kentucky Wildcats and the WKU Hilltoppers, as well select games of Major League Baseball's Cincinnati Reds, which were shared with WGGC.

References

External links

Radio stations established in 1946
CLU (AM)
Glasgow, Kentucky